IFIP Working Group 2.3 on Programming Methodology is a working group of the International Federation for Information Processing (IFIP). Its main aim is to increase programmers’ ability to compose programs. To this end, WG2.3 provides an international forum for discussion and cross-fertilization of ideas between researchers in programming methodology and neighboring fields. Generally, members report on work in progress and expect suggestions and advice. Discussions are often broadened by inviting "observers" to meetings as full participants, some of whom eventually become members.

Scope
This scope of work in WG2.3 was introduced by Edsger W. Dijkstra in meeting 0 (Oslo, Norway, July 1969).
Identification of sources of difficulties encountered in present-day programming;
The interdependence between the formulation of problems and the formulation of programs, and the mapping of relations existing in the world of problems into the relations among programs and their components;
Intellectual disciplines and problem-solving techniques that can aid programmers in the composition of programs;
 The problem of achieving program reliability;
 The consequences of requirements for program adaptability;
 The problem of provability of program correctness and its influence on the structure of programs and on the process of their composition;
 Guidelines of partitioning large programming tasks and defining the interfaces between the parts;
 Software for mechanized assistance to program composition.

History
In December 1968, IFIP Working Group 2.1 adopted the proposal by Aad van Wijngaarden as a successor to Algol 60 (ultimately leading to ALGOL 68). A group of members of WG2.1 opposed it and produced a minority report. The group also felt that rather than just programming languages, a forum was needed to discuss the general problem of programming. Another impetus for the creation of a group was the findings of the first of the NATO Software Engineering Conferences, held in 1968, which spoke of the "software crisis" then seen as gripping the computing world.

The parent committee TC2 of IFIP approved the formation of a new Working Group, WG2.3, for this purpose. Mike Woodger agreed to chair it. 
An organizing meeting was held in Oslo, 20–22 July 1969, with Ole-Johan Dahl, Edsger W. Dijkstra, Douglas McIlroy, Brian Randell, Gerhard Seegmueller, Wlad Turski, 
Doug Ross was also a founding member. Brian Randell suggested the title Programming Methodology.

The founding members were predominately academic, and a deliberate
attempt was made to bring in members from industry and commerce as well as from
Asia and the USSR. WG2.3 generally meets once or twice a year for five days at a time.
Until 1976, all meetings were held in Europe, but after that meetings often alternated between Europe and North America. Several meetings have been held in Australia.

The first meeting was held in Copenhagen, Denmark in 1970. It was attended by 
Ole-Johan Dahl, Edsger W. Dijkstra, Per Brinch Hansen, 
Tony Hoare, M. M. Lehman, J. Madey, Doug McIlroy, 
George Radin, Brian Randell,  
John Reynolds,
Doug Ross,
Christopher Strachey, and Warren Teitelman.

For more on the history of WG2.3, read Mike Woodger's A history of IFIP WG2.3.

In its initial years, WG2.3 did not produce reports of any kind of its meetings. Meetings
centered on the presentation and discussion of research underway, which meant that members
could receive their colleagues' constructive criticism at a much earlier stage that usual.
As such, WG2.3 became a productive assembly at which researchers such as Dijkstra could work out many of the ideas that they subsequently brought forth in published papers.
Ideas from the members of WG2.3 made their way into at least one well-reviewed book written in the mid-1970s.

In the late 1970s, it was felt that WG2.3 should make more public the nature
of its work and what had been accomplished. Accordingly, the 
book Programming Methodology: A Collection of Articles by Members of IFIP WG2.3  was published.

In 2003, a second book Programming Methodology of articles was published. Some essays contained new material while others aimed to review or evaluate an area or to outline problems for further investigation.

Members on Wikipedia, former and current
WG 2.3 has, and has had, many members. Some are the subject of Wikipedia articles.

 Jean-Raymond Abrial Emeritus
 Ralph-Johan Back
 Dines Bjørner Emeritus
 Per Brinch Hansen (d. 2007)
 Manfred Broy
 Rod Burstall Emeritus
 Michael Butler
 William R. Cook (d. 2022)
 Patrick Cousot
 Ole-Johan Dahl (d. 2002)
 Edsger W. Dijkstra (d. 2002)
 Sophia Drossopoulou
 David Gries Emeritus
 John Guttag Emeritus
 Eric C. R. Hehner Emeritus
 Tony Hoare
 Jim Horning (d. 2013)
 Daniel Jackson	
 Michael Jackson
 Cliff Jones
 Shriram Krishnamurthi Emeritus
 Butler W. Lampson Emeritus
 Gary T. Leavens
 Doug McIlroy Emeritus
 George H. Mealy (d. 2010)
 Bertrand Meyer
 Jayadev Misra
 Carroll Morgan
 Peter Naur (d. 2016)
 Greg Nelson (d. 2015)
 Susan Owicki Emeritus
 David Lorge Parnas Emeritus
 Benjamin C. Pierce Emeritus
 George Radin (d. 2013)
 Brian Randell Emeritus
 John C. Reynolds (d. 2013)
 Douglas T. Ross (d. 2007)
 Fred B. Schneider Emeritus
 Natarajan Shankar	
 Michel Sintzoff (d. 2010)
 Jan L. A. van de Snepscheut (d. 1994)
 Christopher Strachey (d. 1975)
 Warren Teitelman Emeritus
 Emina Torlak
 Jim Woodcock
 Niklaus Wirth Emeritus
 Mike Woodger Emeritus
 Pamela Zave

Meetings
 
 
 
 
 
 
 
 
 
 
 
 
 
 
 
 
 
 
 
 
 
 Meeting 41, Biarritz, France, 24–28 March 2003
 Meeting 40, Turku, Finland, 12–16 August 2002
 Meeting 39, Hanover, New Hampshire, USA, 2–6 October 2001
 Meeting 38, Santa Cruz, California, USA, 8–12 January 2001
 Meeting 37, Longhorseley, UK, 3–7 April 2000
 Meeting 36, Munich, Germany, 21–25 June 1999
 Meeting 35, Bloomington, Indiana, USA, 1–5 June 1998
 Meeting 34, Alsace, France, September 1997
 Meeting 33, Napa Valley, California, January 1997
 Meeting 32, Han-sur-Lesse, Belgium, April 1996
 Meeting 31, Ithaca, New York, USA, July 1995
 Meeting 30, Ispra, Italy, June 1994
 Meeting 29, Lake Simcoe, Ontario, Canada, May 1993.
 Meeting 28, New Forest, July 1992.
 Meeting 27, Pouilly-en-Auxois, France, September 1991.
 Meeting 26, Santa Catalina Island, California, USA, December 1990.
 Meeting 25, Munich, Germany, March 1990
 Meeting 24, Zaborów, Poland, June 1989
 Meeting 23, Pittsburg, Pennsylvania, USA, August 1988
 Meeting 22, Habay-la-Neuve, Belgium, November 1987
 Meeting 21, Manchester, UK, April 1985
 Meeting 20, Victoria, British Columbia, Canada, July 1984
 Meeting 19, Pont-à-Mousson, France, September 1983
 Meeting 18, New Paltz, New York, USA, September 1982
 Meeting 17, Sintra, Portugal, October 1981
 Meeting 16, Han-sur-Lesse, Belgium, January 1981
 Meeting 15, Kazimierz Dolny, Poland, April 1980
 Meeting 14, Santa Cruz, California, USA, August 1979
 Meeting 13, Warwick, UK, April 1978
 Meeting 12, Niagara-on-the-Lake, Ontario, Canada, August 1977
 Meeting 11, St. Pierre de Chartruese, France, December 1976
 Meeting 10, Cazenovia, Illinois, USA, July 1976
 Meeting 9, Baden bei Wien, Austria, September 1975
 Meeting 8, Munich, Germany, December 1974
 Meeting 7, Boldern, Switzerland, April 1974
 Meeting 6, Blanchland, UK, October 1973
 Meeting 5, Munich, Germany, April 1973
 Meeting 4, Warsaw, Poland, September 1972
 Meeting 3, Bristol, UK, January 1972
 Meeting 2, Warwick, UK, April 1971
 Meeting 1, Copenhagen, Denmark, March 1970
 Meeting 0, Oslo, Norway, July 1969

Source:

References

External links
IFIP WG 2.3, Working Group on Programming Methodology

International Federation for Information Processing
Software development process
Software engineering organizations